Crenshaw is a surname. Notable people with the surname include:

 Ander Crenshaw (born 1944), American politician 
 Anderson Crenshaw (1783–1847), American jurist
 Ben Crenshaw (born 1952), American professional golfer
 Caroline A. Crenshaw, American lawyer
 Dan Crenshaw (born 1984), American politician
 Dave Crenshaw (born 1975), American author
 George L. Crenshaw (1855–1937), American real estate developer and banker
 James L. Crenshaw, American biblical professor
 John Crenshaw (1797–1871), American landowner and slave trader 
 John Bascom Crenshaw (1861–1942), American athlete
 John T. Crenshaw (1820–1863), American soldier
 Kimberlé Crenshaw (born 1959), American lawyer
 Leon Crenshaw (1943–2008), American football player
 Marshall Crenshaw (born 1953), American singer, songwriter and guitarist
 Martha Crenshaw (born 1945), American professor
 Marvin Crenshaw (born 1952), American football player
 Mary Mayo Crenshaw (1875-1951), American writer
 Mic Crenshaw (born 1970), American recording artist
 Robert Crenshaw, American drummer
 Roberta Crenshaw (1914–2005), American philanthropist
 Waverly D. Crenshaw Jr. (born 1956), American judge
 Willis Crenshaw (born 1941), American football player

Fictional characters:
 Peter Crenshaw, a character from the Three Investigators juvenile detective book series
 David Crenshaw, player character of Tom Clancy's H.A.W.X
 Mindy Crenshaw, fictional character on the American sitcom Drake & Josh